Treatise on money may refer to
 Monetae cudendae ratio, also called Treatise on Money, 1526 paper by Nicolaus Copernicus
 A Treatise on Money, 1930 book by John Maynard Keynes